OM Digital Solutions Corporation (OMDS) (OMデジタルソリューションズ) is a Japanese manufacturer of opto-digital products for business and consumer use. The company acquired the cameras, audio recorders and binoculars product divisions of the manufacturer Olympus in January 2021.

History 
On 30 September 2020, Olympus announced that it had entered into an agreement with financial investor Japan Industrial Partners (JIP) to transfer the Olympus Imaging division to a newly established wholly-owned subsidiary of Olympus. This subsidiary was named OM Digital Solutions. On 1 January 2021, 95% of the shares in OM Digital Solutions were transferred to OJ Holdings, Ltd, a specially established subsidiary of JIP. Olympus retained ownership of the remaining 5%.

References

External Links 

 Official website

Electronics companies of Japan
Japanese brands
Lens manufacturers
Manufacturing companies based in Tokyo
Optics manufacturing companies
Photography companies of Japan